This is a list of charities in the Philippines.

Angat Buhay Foundation (formally Angat Pinas, Inc.)
Bantay Bata 163
Children's Shelter of Cebu
Fairplay For All Foundation
Gawad Kalinga
Kapwa Ko Mahal Ko
Maharlika Charity Foundation
Roots of Health
Third World Movement Against the Exploitation of Women
Visayan Forum
Anawim Lay Missions Foundation
Children of the Mekong
Reception and Study Center for Children (RSCC)
GMA Kapuso Foundation
The Haven for the Elderly (formerly Golden Acres)

See also

References 

Philippines
Charities